Migdal Oz (lit. Tower of Strength) is an Israeli settlement and income-sharing community kibbutz in the West Bank. Located in the historic Etzion bloc 7.4 km from the Green Line and west of the Israeli West Bank barrier, it falls under the jurisdiction of Gush Etzion Regional Council. It neighbors the communities of Kfar Etzion, Alon Shevut, Elazar and Efrat.

The international community considers Israeli settlements in the West Bank illegal under international law, but the Israeli government disputes this.

History 
Migdal Oz was established in 1977 on the site of Migdal Eder, a Jewish village destroyed 50 years previously early in the course of the 1948 Arab–Israeli War. The name is taken from a Biblical phrase describing God, written in Psalm 61:4 and Proverbs 18:10.

Located in Migdal Oz is the Migdal Oz Beit Midrash which is headed by Esti Rosenberg and operates under the auspices of Yeshivat Har Etzion. The seminary building also houses the women's campus of the Herzog College, which prepares its students for teaching. The college teaches 14 subjects.

In January 2013, the Israeli Defense Forces arrested a Palestinian who admitted to firing a gun in the direction of a security post at the entrance of Migdal Oz, not hurting anyone.

Economy 
Its main agricultural pursuits include three turkey coops with 16,000 birds apiece, a dairy housing 260 cows that is among the largest in the country, and fruit orchards. Along with neighbouring Gush Etzion, Rosh Tzurim, and Kfar Etzion, Migdal Oz jointly farms six square kilometers of olive groves near Kiryat Malakhi and Lakhish in the shfelah.

Migdal Oz is also home to some high tech and light industry. The eponymous Migdal Oz seminary, an advanced women's yeshiva, was opened in 1997.

References

External links 
 

Religious Kibbutz Movement
Religious Israeli settlements
Populated places established in 1977
Gush Etzion Regional Council
1977 establishments in the Israeli Military Governorate

Israeli settlements in the West Bank